Microsternus is a genus of pleasing fungus beetles in the family Erotylidae.

Species
These three species belong to the genus Microsternus:
 Microsternus perforatus (Lewis, 1883) g
 Microsternus tricolor Lewis, 1887 g
 Microsternus ulkei (Crotch, 1873) i c g b
Data sources: i = ITIS, c = Catalogue of Life, g = GBIF, b = Bugguide.net

References

Erotylidae
Cucujoidea genera